Chalangwa is an administrative ward in the Chunya district of the Mbeya Region of Tanzania. In 2016 the Tanzania National Bureau of Statistics report there were 8,831 people in the ward, from 8,013 in 2012.

Villages / vitongoji 
The ward has 3 villages and 14 vitongoji.

 Chalangwa
 Chalangwa A
 Chalangwa B
 Chalangwa C
 Chemichemi
 Wazenga A
 Wazenga B
 Itumba
 Itumba
 Kanjilinji
 Njiapanda
 Simbalivu
 Isewe
 Isewe
 Izumbi
 Mbilwa
 Mbinga

References 

Wards of Mbeya Region